Nawab Sardar Baz Mohammad Khan Jogezai was a Pashtun tribal elder and the only representative from Baluchistan Province to the Constituent Assembly of Pakistan.

Early life 
Jogezai was born to Bangul Khan Jogezai in 1884 at Killa Saifullah. In 1906, he was appointed a Sardar of the Bori Tahsil in Loralai District by the Coronation Durbar. Under the Sandeman system, these Sardars were paid monthly emoluments in return for maintaining peace in their frontier tracts; Jogezai received Rs. 1800, as of September 1935.

Political career

British India 
In August 1946, Jafar Khan Jamali — then, an upstart leader of the provincial Muslim League — persuaded Jogezai to submit his candidature for representing Baluchistan Province at the Constituent Assembly of India as an independent candidate after Qazi Muhammad Isa, the original League candidate, refused to proceed with his candidature. Jogezai's opponent was Abdul Samad Khan Achakzai of the Anjuman-i-Watan Baluchistan, who was supported by the Indian National Congress. It appears unlikely that any poll did take place; a pro-League faction of the electorate published public letters including in local newspapers expressing support for Jogezai and soon enough, he had secured a super-majority of over forty signatures against a paltry ten by Achakzai. Despite the win, Jogezai abdicated attendance until the Mountbatten Plan sanctioned the creation of Pakistan and its own constituent assembly, obeying the League.

During the Partition, he played a significant role in ensuring that the referendum on the province's accession to Pakistan passed smoothly despite opposition from Sardars who were aligned to the Congress or the Khanate of Kalat, preferring outright independence or accession to India. Scholars and activists sympathetic to Baloch ethno-nationalist causes narrate that Jogezai, having failed to win the confidence of the electorate in multiple discussions on the accession, had the voting preponed by a day. Yet, there was renewed pandemonium with representatives of tribal factions unclear on the implications of accession to their political future and no voting could take place; nonetheless, Jogezai, in connivance with the British Government, declared a successful accession. Pro-Pakistan authors concede that the accession was won by manipulations but downplay their significance; Jogezai's declaration of accession without depending on a poll is portrayed as an ingenious strategy to outmaneuver the British Government who had apparently postponed the vote by a day to buy more time for the Indian National Congress. Axmann agrees that no voting did take place but finds it impossible to sieve out further truth from these competing claims which fail to agree even on the basics like the strength of the electorate or the date of accession; however, he feels that the accession would have succeeded irrespective of Jogezai's alleged stratagems.

Pakistan 
Jogezai had an insignificant role in the Constituent Assembly, choosing to remain absent during most of the proceedings. Records show that he took part in a division of the house only once voting against an amendment that sought to prevent the state from suspending fundamental rights on grounds of "internal discontent"; he did not table any amendment and would deliver his solitary speech on 13 October 1953, a year before the eventual dissolution of the Assembly, criticizing the denial of political reforms in Balochistan as an insult to Jinnah's (and the League's) assurances before and during the accession.

In June 1949, Jogezai was appointed an advisor to Mian Aminuddin, the Chief-Commissioner of the province before being replaced in August, 1950. In March 1952, he was appointed by the Assembly as a member of the Advisory Committee for the Ministry of States and Frontier Regions. In September 1958, the Government of Pakistan chose Jogezai as its envoy to pacify the Khanate of Kalat who — in collaboration with Achakzai, Abdul Ghaffar Khan, and others — rejected the One Unit Scheme and demanded the restoration of his erstwhile territories as a single state; the parley failed and martial law would be imposed in the next month, leading to the Jhalwan Disturbances.

In the 1970 Pakistani general election, Jogezai was nominated by the Qayyum Muslim League from Quetta I; he was defeated by Maulvi Abdul Haq.

Death and legacy 
Jogezai's family remains significant in Baloch politics. His elder son Gul Mohammad Khan Jogezai was the Governor of Balochistan from 1991 to 1994; the younger son, Jahangir Shah Jogezai was a bureaucrat before his appointment to the Senate in 1985. Among his grandsons, Nawab Ayaz Jogezai has served in the Provincial Assembly, the National Assembly, and the Senate.

Notelist

References 

Pashtun people
Members of the Constituent Assembly of Pakistan